Maathu Tappada Maga is a 1978 Indian Kannada language film, written and directed by Peketi Sivaram. It stars Anant Nag, Sharada, Aarathi and Rajinikanth . It was the 25th film of Rajinikanth.

Cast 
 Anant Nag as Kumar 
Aarathi
Sharada
Rajinikanth as Chandru
 K. S. Ashwath
 Dwarakish
 Narasimharaju
 T. N. Balakrishna
 Peketi Sivaram
 Leelavathi
 Bangalore Nagesh

Soundtrack
Ilaiyaraaja composed the music for the film's soundtracks, with lyrics written by R. N. Jayagopal. The album consists of four tracks. Ilayaraja later reused the song "Bhanu Bhoomiya" as "Edho Ninaivugal" for the Tamil film Agal Vilakku (1979).

References 

1970s Kannada-language films
1978 films
Films scored by Ilaiyaraaja
Films directed by Peketi Sivaram